Simon Strong (born 1964) is a North English writer, musician and
film-maker currently resident in Melbourne, Australia. He is best known
as author of "A259 Multiplex Bomb 'Outrage'" and as front-man for the
psychedelic new-wave group Pink Stainless Tail.

Early life

Strong was raised in Ecclesfield, South Yorkshire, and attended local
comprehensive schools. Family connections allowed him to pursue an
interest in electronics and computing, and from the mid-seventies he was
active in local computer clubs and his programs and articles were
published in home computer magazines. In 1982, Strong left Sheffield to
attend Brighton Polytechnic and went on to work programming for
artificial intelligence projects, specialising in the then new field of
interface design. Increasingly politicised by the rise of Thatcherism,
Strong dropped out of computing and took a succession of menial jobs
(including toilet cleaner, bouncer and bookseller) and concentrated on
creative writing. During a tenure at Hatchards Booksellers, Strong
helped organise literary events by authors including Nick Cave and
Billy Childish.

By 1989 Strong was residing above an Indian take-away in the red-light
district with Palmer and Taylor of beat group The Fire Dept. They were
often visited by experimental novelist Stewart Home, who exerted a
profound influence on Strong's writing. Around this time, Strong was
also performing with his own outfit, the Barry Jeffries.

Overground / CodeX

From 1993-97 Strong worked for Overground Records, based at their
production and distribution centre in Hove. He co-ordinated and designed
covers for artists including The Television Personalities, AlternativeTV,  Richard Hell, Alex Fergusson, The Undead (ex-Misfits), TheeHeadcoats, Man or Astroman?, Subway Sect, GG Allin. Strong was
instrumental in the re-issuing the oeuvre of Jon the Postman.

In 1996, inspired by small presses such as Atlas Press, Temple Press and
Creation Books, Strong founded CodeX Books and Records as a branch of
Overground.  Over the next 12 months he issued Stewart Home's 'Cranked
Up Really High', Richard Hell's 'The Voidoid', Billy Childish's 'My
Fault' and Kathy Acker's 'Pussy' on CD. Creation Books had previously
accepted Strong's novel "A259 Multiplex Bomb 'Outrage'" but delays in
its publication led to Strong issuing the book on the CodeX imprint. The
book was enthusiastically received, selling out two printings in six
months, but momentum was lost when Strong suddenly emigrated to
Australia in early 1997, although a Russian translation of the book
appeared in 2006.

Melbourne, Australia

After a hiatus, Strong joined Harry Howard, Sonke Rickertsen and Nick
Boddington to form The Pink Stainless Tail in 2001, and went on to
release three records. The group was popular with a small but fanatical group of fans with Strong's stage persona memorably (and consistently)
described as "a flailing scarecrow amalgam of William Burroughs and Mark E Smith".

In February 2004, the Victorian College of the Arts invited Stewart Home
as writer in residence and commissioned Strong to run a course to
introduce students to Home's themes and praxis. Around this time, Strong
set up his netlabel, The LedaTape Organisation, as an outlet for his
work and others.

Over the next few years Strong finalised two books (in collaboration
with Jason Crest) that had been in development since the publication of
'A259'. 'Rape vs. Murder' was produced entirely (in one run) by a
computer program from a corpus of books published by [The Paris Olympia
Press], whilst '66mindfuck99' was a fictionalised account of the
creation of the former. Both of these publications were privately
printed and circulated samizdat, not because their content was
contentious, but rather due to Strong's vehement rejection of the
conventional publishing paradigm. Despite their limited availability,
the books were well received and in 2010 were taught at the University
of Pennsylvania by Kenneth Goldsmith, curator of ubu.com.

Novels

A259 Multiplex Bomb "Outrage" (CodeX)
66mindfuck99 (with Jason Crest, hors commers)
Rape vs. Murder (wihg #579, hors commers)

CD releases

'The Infinite Wisdom of the Pink Stainless Tail' with The Pink Stainless Tail : CD : March 2007
'This is me in the park with no clothes on… I like the flowers' with The Pink Stainless Tail : CD : May 2005
'The Sky's a Soft Target' with The Pink Stainless Tail : CD : 2003

References

Internet Book List - Simon Strong

Senses of Cinema - 'Lesbian Vampires vs Situationist International', 2004

Simon's staff page at VCA (archived)

Pink Stainless Tail interview at Perfect Sound Forever

Living people
1964 births
English writers